The Presidential Designate was a Colombian elected official, chosen by the Senate to ensure the presidential line of succession. The title of Presidential Designate did not bring any official office or duties, its sole purpose was to replace the President of Colombia in case of absence, death, or inability to hold office.

History

The title was first instituted by the Colombian Constitution of 1843, where Congress would choose a "designate" who would assume the Presidency of Colombia in the absence of both the President and the Vice President. The Colombian Constitution of 1853 formalized the position of Presidential Designate and in 1858, the office of the Vice President was also abolished, and the line of succession was broken and modified, calling for annual elections of First, Second, and Third Presidential Designates to confirm a transition of power, and made the Presidential Designates the successors to the presidency, or in their absence, the heads of the Ministries of Colombia, going from oldest to youngest. After the ratification of the Colombian Constitution of 1886, the vice-presidency was reinstituted, but because of the resignation of vice president Eliseo Payán in 1887 and the later accession of vice president Miguel Antonio Caro to the presidency in 1892, Congress was forced to elect interim presidential designates once again. In 1905, President Rafael Reyes abolished once again the vice presidency, and amended the constitution to allow him to choose only when necessary the presidential designates in order to avoid historical rivalries between President and Vice President such as the coup against Manuel Antonio Sanclemente by his vice president José Manuel Marroquín, but a year after his 1909 overthrow, in 1910, Congress reinstituted the titles of First and Second Presidential Designates, giving Senate the task of electing new ones every two years. Because of constitutional reforms in 1945, the title of Second Presidential Designate was terminated, leaving just one presidential designate. The Colombian Constitution of 1991, reestablished the vice presidency, but it allowed the election of a presidential designate until the end of the term of President César Gaviria. The last Presidential Designate was Juan Manuel Santos, who later served two terms as President of Colombia.

See also
List of Presidential Designates of Colombia

References

 

Titles
Government of Colombia